The 2019 Yongchuan International Tournament was the 5th edition of the Yongchuan International Tournament, an invitational women's football tournament held in Yongchuan District, Chongqing, China. Unlike the previous editions of the tournament where each team played all the other teams, 2019 tournament was played in bracket format where the winners of the first round played each other and the losers of the first round played each other to determine the standings.

Participants
In September 2019, the participants were announced.

Venues

Match results
All times are local, CST (UTC+8).

Semi-finals

Third place playoff

Final

Statistics

References 

2019 in women's association football
2019
2019 in Chinese football
November 2019 sports events in China
2019 in Chinese women's sport